The second season of Charmed, an American supernatural drama television series created by Constance M. Burge, originally aired in the United States on The WB from September 30, 1999 through May 18, 2000. Airing on Thursdays at 9:00 pm. Paramount Home Entertainment released the complete second season in a six-disc box set on September 6, 2005.

Cast and Characters

Main 
 Shannen Doherty as Prue Halliwell / P. Bowen
 Holly Marie Combs as Piper Halliwell / P. Baxter
 Alyssa Milano as Phoebe Halliwell / P. Russell
 Greg Vaughan as Dan Gordon / Gordon Johnson
 Dorian Gregory as Darryl Morris
 Karis Paige Bryant as Jenny Gordon
 Brian Krause as Leo Wyatt

Recurring 
 Lochlyn Munro as Jack Sheridan

Guest 
Jennifer Rhodes as Penny Halliwell
Finola Hughes as Patty Halliwell
Scott Jaeck as Sam Wilder
Misha Collins as Eric Bragg
Dean Norris as Collector #1
Billy Drago as Barbas
Hynden Walch as Marcey Steadwell
Tyler Christopher as Anton
Arnold Vosloo as Spirit Killer
Amy Adams as Maggie Murphy

Special Guest 
 Antonio Sabato Jr. as Bane Jessup

Special Musical Guest 
 Dishwalla
 The Cranberries
 Janice Robinson
 Goo Goo Dolls
 Paula Cole

Special Appearances
 Steve Railsback as Litvack (A Demon)
 French Stewart as Genie

Episodes

Notes

References

External links 
 
 

Charmed (TV series)
Charmed (TV series) episodes
1999 American television seasons
2000 American television seasons